Texas A&M University–Commerce is a public university in Commerce, Texas. With an enrollment of over 12,000 students as of fall 2017, the university is the third-largest institution in the Texas A&M University System. Founded in 1889, the institution is also the fourth-oldest state university or college in the State of Texas.

In addition to the main campus in Hunt County, the university has satellite campuses in downtown Dallas and Mesquite; it also offers courses in Corsicana and Midlothian in partnership with Navarro College and in Frisco and McKinney with Collin College.

History

The history of Texas A&M University–Commerce commenced in 1889 with its establishment as East Texas Normal College (ETNC) in Cooper by Kentucky native William L. Mayo as a private teachers' college based on Normal principles. ETNC relocated to Commerce after its original campus was destroyed in a fire in July 1894. One of Commerce's chief advantages was that it was well connected by rail, boasting regular service on the St. Louis Southwestern Railway of Texas ("Cotton Belt") to Dallas, Sherman, and Texarkana and on the Texas Midland Railroad to Paris, Ennis, and Houston.

ETNC was renamed East Texas State Normal College in 1917 after it was acquired by the State of Texas and transformed into a public college. In 1923, it was renamed East Texas State Teachers College to define its purpose "more clearly", and in 1935, it began its graduate education program.

The institution was renamed East Texas State College in 1957, after the Texas Legislature recognized its broadening scope beyond teacher education. Following the inauguration of the institution's first doctoral program in 1962, its name was changed to East Texas State University (ETSU) in 1965. It integrated in 1964 when ordered to do so by the board of regents. ETSU obtained a separate board of regents in 1969, and the approval to open a branch campus in Texarkana in 1971.

While the student body shrank in size in the late 1970s and early 1980s, it became increasingly diverse as older nontraditional students, ethnic and racial minorities, and international students all grew in numbers. The economic downturn in Texas in the mid-1980s seriously threatened the university, leading to proposals to close it entirely before a bus trip with 450 supporters trekked to the State Capitol in a show of support that ultimately secured its continued existence. In 1996, ETSU was admitted into the Texas A&M University System (TAMUS) and renamed Texas A&M University–Commerce (A&M–Commerce). ETSU's former branch campus in Texarkana was renamed Texas A&M University–Texarkana and admitted into TAMUS as a separate university.

University presidents 

 William Leonidas Mayo (1889–1917)
 Randolph Binnion (1917–24)
 Samuel Henry Whitley (1924–46)
 Arthur C. Ferguson (Interim)(1947)
 James Gilliam Gee (1947–66)
 D. Whitney Halladay (1966–72)
 F.H. McDowell (1972–82)
 Charles J. Austin (1982–87)
 Jerry D. Morris (1987–97)
 Keith D. McFarland (1997–2008)
 Dan R. Jones (2008–16)
 Ray Keck (2016–2018)
 Mark J. Rudin (2018–present)

Colleges and schools

Texas A&M University–Commerce comprises five academic colleges awarding degrees in over 100 diverse disciplines.

The College of Education and Human Services is perhaps the most well-known college within the university and is one of the foremost education-focused institutions in the state of Texas among all universities, both public and private, and has produced numerous successful and notable teachers and school administrators. Texas A&M Commerce has agreements with many school districts in the DFW area and Northeast Texas to send their undergraduates to student-teach, and also has a notable graduate school for those educators who are in pursuit of advanced degrees in teaching and education and also, a well known doctoral program for those pursuing a PhD in education. Accordingly, Texas A&M-Commerce is a Level II Doctoral Research University, classified by the Carnegie Foundation for the Advancement of Teaching. In the summer of 2013, the College of Education and Human Services at Texas A&M-Commerce was ranked number one in  Texas for teaching education among all universities, public and private, and 13th in the entire nation by the Directory of U.S. Colleges Database Online Magazine.

The College of Business (CB) has over the past three decades become a highly respected  business school in  Texas and beyond. The CB offers graduate and undergraduate degrees in accounting, finance, general business administration, management, marketing, applied arts and sciences, and business analytics. The CB has been nationally recognized for its MBA program, and was ranked as the fifth-best program overall in the 2012 edition of U.S. News & World Reports annual "Best Graduate School" issue. Both the MBA and the undergraduate accounting programs were mentioned in both Forbes and the Wall Street Journal as best buys for programs offered by  schools in Texas. The college also has a large number of professors with tenure and emeritus status, who provide lectures and speaking engagements nationally and internationally, which reflects the  quality of business-oriented educational opportunity that Texas A&M-Commerce has to offer.

The College of Humanities, Social Sciences, and Arts offers degree programs for most liberal-arts programs offered at Texas A&M-Commerce. Degrees and courses of study offered in this college include liberal arts, history, performing arts, music and music education, literature and language, mass media and communications, theatre, political science, and sociology and criminal justice. The college also offers undergraduates who are pursuing a political science degree who wish to attend law school for postgraduate work, a career in a law-preparatory program, as well as LSAT test preparation that is also administered on campus. Students who major in broadcast journalism and mass media are given the opportunity to join the staff for the school newspaper, and also use and perfect skills working for KKOM, KETV-3, and the region's source for public broadcasting radio news and information, KETR.

The College of Science and Engineering is the most recent academic addition at Texas A&M University–Commerce. This college offers degrees in biology, environmental sciences, chemistry, computer Science and information systems, computational science, mathematics, engineering technology, physics, and astronomy. The physics and astronomy department has an award-winning planetarium located within the McFarland Science Building, attracting students from area schools and interested visitors, as well.

The College of Agricultural Sciences and Natural Resources
The School of Agriculture was renamed the College of Agricultural Sciences and Natural Resources in April 2018. Majors include agribusiness, agricultural sciences, agricultural science and technology, animal science, wildlife and conservation science, and equine studies. The college operates an educational farm and ranch about 5 miles south of Commerce on Texas State Highway 24, where students are able to engage in a hands-on approach to agriculture sciences and animal handling.

Campus 
 
The campus is located 15 minutes from Interstate 30 and an hour drive from Dallas, Texas State Highway 24 intersects the campus into two separate sections. The majority of the campus is located on the east side of Highway 24, and a smaller portion is located on the west side. A picturesque lake is located near the main campus entrance. The campus has a range of newer and older buildings, with the oldest building being Ferguson Social Sciences Building, which opened in 1926 with classrooms and a large auditorium. One of the newer buildings on campus is the Phase II residence hall which was constructed in 2013. The university also owns and operates an 1,800-acre farm and ranch with an equine center located near the main campus. A new Music Building was recently constructed that includes a state of the art concert hall for various musical performances.

Waters Library 

Velma K Waters Library is named in honor of the first undergraduate African American student to enroll at A&M-Commerce. She graduated with a Bachelor of Science degree from the university in 1968 and taught in Carthage, Texas. The library was previously named in honor of Dr. James Gilliam Gee, a former president of the university who served from 1947 to 1966, but was renamed in August 2020. A laptop kiosk in the library allows students to check out laptops for their studies. Many services for students and faculty are available in the library, including book renewal, a 24-hour computer-study area known as the nexus, research assistance, and study carrels providing quiet study areas for students.

Morris Recreation Center 

The Morris Recreation Center (MRC) opened in 2003. The center is named in honor of Dr. Jerry D. Morris, who served as the president of the university from 1987 to 1997. The university's intramural sports programs are organized by the staff of the center. The inside of the center features a 45-foot climbing rock, a three-lane jogging track, four racquetball courts, two basketball courts, a large fitness room with cardiovascular and weight equipment, an aerobics room, classrooms, a snack area, and locker rooms. Outside the center are a pool, two basketball courts, and two sand-volleyball courts. An outdoor futsal court is on the grounds of the MRC.

The center also operates the Cain Sports Complex for intramural sports. The complex includes four multipurpose sports fields, multipurpose green space, horseshoe pits, barbecue grills, and picnic tables. Outdoor Adventure operates the rock wall inside the center and the outdoor adventure facilities on the west side of campus. Many trails for hiking are available near the campus for outdoor adventure, as well an 18-hole disc golf course. A challenge course is available on the grounds of Outdoor Adventure.

Rayburn Student Center 

The Rayburn Student Center (RSC) serves as a focal site for activities and events on campus. Many university organizations are located in the RSC. The RSC also includes the primary student dining facility that was recently improved and expanded. Also, a bookstore located on the first floor of the building offers supplies, school themed spirit merchandise, and other items related to the university. The Club, an entertainment/gathering area, is where various student-oriented events take place. The Club features a drink and snack bar, a game room, and a stage with a panoramic television screen. The RSC is named in honor of the Honorable Sam Rayburn, the longest-tenured Speaker of the United States House of Representatives in U.S. history and a distinguished university alumnus (class of 1903). A statue of Mr. Rayburn is situated on the front entry terrace to the RSC standing in a familiar setting in front of the Speaker's rostrum that was an integral part of the House of Representatives legislative chamber in the United States Capitol Building.

Financials

TAMUC is historically committed to making higher education accessibility affordable to those in need. The university has established an "in tuition" program, allowing students to "lock-in" their incoming freshmen tuition rates for the duration of their undergraduate study, regardless of potential future tuition increases. Moreover, the university stands as the least expensive research institution in the Dallas–Fort Worth metroplex, as well as one of the least expensive universities in the State of Texas. For the 2014–2015 academic year, in-state tuition rates for freshmen students taking 15 credits each semester typically were about $7000 per year or $236 per credit hour. As of 2019, the university has an endowment of $22 million.

Student body
Located an hour's drive from downtown Dallas, Texas A&M-Commerce attracts a majority of its students from the Dallas/Fort Worth Metroplex; as of fall 2016, over 500 students each from Collin, Dallas, Hunt, Rockwall, and Tarrant Counties attended the university, but in the last decade, the number of out-of-state students has grown considerably; while nearby Oklahoma, Arkansas, and Louisiana are the most common states of origin, Texas A&M-Commerce has attracted a substantial number of students from geographically distant states such as Illinois, Michigan, and Ohio. In recent years, many of the university's student athletes originate from California.

As part of a quality-enhancement plan, the university has focused on diversifying its student body with a goal of becoming a more globally competitive university. As a result, persons from all racial backgrounds and many ethnic groups attend TAMUC. The university has a strong Indian community and a large Korean presence. Recently, the institution has also seen a substantive growth in its Nigerian students. In fall 2016, international students comprised 6.8% of the student body. In fall 2015, the university's acceptance rate was 45%.

Demographics

Ranked from highest to lowest.

 Gender
Female: 60.75%
Male: 39.25%

 Race
White: 46.92%
Black or African American: 20.10%
Hispanic: 16.84%
International: 6.80%
Biracial or multiracial: 4.77%
Asian 2.51%
Not specified: 1.38%
Other/Unclassified 1.35%
Native American or Alaskan: 0.55%
Hawaiian or Pacific Islander: 0.13%

Note: Based on fall 2016 enrollment

Student life
Due to the growth in student enrollment experienced over the last decade, the university has witnessed a substantial increase in the number of student organizations. Currently, over 150 student groups and organizations are registered on campus. Each year, the various organizations host an array of events to include art displays, cultural shows, dance-offs, concerts, comedy shows, taste fests, poetry readings, and step shows, to name a few.

Numerous honor societies and scholastic fraternities have members based on major or course of study. Furthermore, social fraternities and sororities are active at Texas A&M Commerce, with 11 registered fraternities and 10 sororities.

Many religious organizations also call the campus home, such as the Baptist Student Ministry, Wesleyan Ministry, Catholic Student Association, Episcopal Student Association, Lions for Christ, Chi Alpha Christian Fellowship, and Muslim Student Association, among others.

In the state-of-the-art planetarium within the science building, students, faculty and visitors may view movies and astronomical programs on the planetarium ceiling while seated almost fully reclined. The planetarium is considered one of the most significant and modern planetariums on a university campus in the Southwestern United States.

Media
A 100,000-watt FM public radio station, KETR, is licensed through the university. Founded in 1974, KETR serves the communities of Northeast Texas and A&M-Commerce. The station offers a variety format, and broadcasts locally hosted presentations of National Public Radio news programs, Morning Edition and All Things Considered. During middays, KETR broadcasts Notably Texan, a multigenre music program featuring new releases from Texas musicians or music with a Texas connection. KETR also broadcasts A&M-Commerce football and basketball games, as well as football games for Commerce High School.

The East Texan is the weekly student newspaper for Texas A&M-Commerce and was ranked one of the top-10 college newspapers in Texas at the Texas Intercollegiate Press Association (TIPA) meeting in April 2015. Established in 1915, "The East Texan" one of the oldest student collegiate publications in the nation. It is part of the department-based TIPA, headquartered in the Journalism Building. Its circulation is approximately 1,000. The weekly publication was ranked as the number-one album reviewer in Texas at the TIPA Press Convention in April 2014, 2015, and 2016.

Newscenter 3 is a weekly news broadcast produced by the students of radio and television.

Housing and dining services
A&M-Commerce offers housing to students year round with prices ranging from around $2000 to $3000 for each full semester. Every residence hall and campus apartment is coeducational with the exception of F-Halls, which are the women and sorority housing on campus. In an effort to increase the university's student-retention rate, traditional freshmen sign a contract to stay on campus for a minimum of two years or four semesters. Sodexo serves as the student dining vendor for students, with meal plans and at athletic events and a number of catered events on campus throughout the year. The university recently made shuttle services available to students on campus,  augment student mobility on campus and points nearby. 

Residence halls restricted to traditional freshmen:
Pride Rock
Whitley
Residence halls restricted to upperclassmen and nontraditional freshmen:
Berry
Phase II
Smith
Phase III
Campus apartments restricted to upperclassmen and nontraditional freshmen:
New Pride
West Halls (Bledsoe, Craddock, Fling, Neu, Webster, and Wray) 
Other university-operated residences:
F-Halls (restricted to women and sorority housing)
Prairie Crossing (restricted to Honors College students)

Samuel H. Whitley Hall
The most visible landmark of the university is Samuel H. Whitley Hall, a 12-story (146-foot-tall) building named after former University President Dr. Samuel Whitley (1924–1946). Whitley Hall serves as a dormitory for traditional freshmen on campus.

Athletics

Texas A&M–Commerce (TAMUC) athletic teams are the Lions. The university is a member of the Division I level of the National Collegiate Athletic Association (NCAA), primarily competing in the Southland Conference. Previously, the Lions participated in the Lone Star Conference (LSC) from 1931–32 academic year until the 2021–22 season.

Texas A&M–Commerce competes in 12 intercollegiate varsity sports: Men's sports include basketball, cross country, football, golf and track & field; while women's sports include basketball, cross country, golf, soccer, softball, track & field and volleyball.

Accomplishments
Texas A&M-Commerce has won two national football championships; 2017 NCAA Division II Championship and 1972 NAIA Championship. They also won the national championship as members of the NAIA in men's basketball during the 1954–55 season, men's team golf in 1965, and men's team tennis in 1972 and 1978. Additionally, several track and field athletes have won individual national championships as recently as 2019.

Alumni association

The alumni association for Texas A&M University–Commerce, having been organized only one year after the founding of the university in 1890 and called the Alumnal Association at that time, now serves as a liaison between the university and over 100,000 alumni and friends. Each year, the nonprofit organization hosts various workshops, seminars, and other events designed to advance the mission and membership of the Association in addition to programs with the purpose of enhancing job prospects of TAMUC students and graduates. The Texas A&M University–Commerce Alumni Association is housed in the new Alumni Center completed in 2009.

Notable Alumni and Faculty
 List of Texas A&M University-Commerce people

References

External links

 
 Official athletics website

 
Universities and colleges accredited by the Southern Association of Colleges and Schools
Education in Hunt County, Texas
Buildings and structures in Hunt County, Texas
Educational institutions established in 1889
1889 establishments in Texas
Public universities and colleges in Texas